The Lonely Revolts are an American Christian punk band, who primarily play punk rock and Oi!. They are from Salinas, California, and they were formed in 2011 by Josh Galvan and Lupe Gutierrez. The Lonely Revolts include Josh Galvan (Guitar & Vocals), Lupe Gutierrez (Bass & Vocals) and Chip Fratangelo (Drums).

Having contributed tracks to "Punk Never Dies Vol.1" (2011), "Punk For The Gospel Vol. 1" (2012), and the "Kicking It Old School" 7 inch (2012) compilations, The Lonely Revolts released their debut album "Remnant" on Thumper Punk Records on October 30, 2012.

Discography
Studio albums
 Remnant - CD/Digital Download (October 30, 2012, Thumper Punk)
 Broken Bones Burning Hearts (January 30, 2015, Thumper Punk)
Acoustic albums
 Remnant - (Lights Out) (January 16, 2013, Thumper Punk)
Other album appearances
 Punk Never Dies Vol. 1 - V/A Digital Download (2011, Indie Vision)
 Punk For The Gospel Vol. 1 - V/A CD/Digital Download (2012, Thumper Punk)
 Kickin It Old School - V/A 7"/Digital Download (2012, Veritas Vinyl)

References

External links

 HM Magazine announces The Lonely Revolts release of debut album
 Indie Vision Music announces The Lonely Revolts release of debut album
 Punk Rock 77 Thru Today interview with The Lonely Revolts
 The Metal Resource announces The Lonely Revolts release of debut album

Musical groups established in 2011
Christian punk groups
Oi! groups
Punk rock groups from California
People from Salinas, California
2011 establishments in California